The Udjiji worm lizard (Loveridgea phylofiniens) is a worm lizard species in the family Amphisbaenidae. It is found in Tanzania.

References

Loveridgea
Endemic fauna of Tanzania
Reptiles of Tanzania
Reptiles described in 1899
Taxa named by Gustav Tornier